Nick Anderson may refer to:

Arts and entertainment
Nick Anderson (cartoonist), American editorial cartoonist
Nick Anderson (musician) (born 1995), American frontman of alternative rock band the Wrecks
Nick Anderson, character in Anderson's Cross

Sports
Nick Anderson (baseball) (born 1990), American baseball player
Nick Anderson (basketball) (born 1968), American basketball player
Nick Anderson (footballer) (1865–1921), English footballer

See also
Nicholas Anderson (disambiguation)
Nicky Andersen (born 1969), English footballer